Polarårboken Glacier is a glacier,  northeast of Stein Islands, draining westward into the north part of Publications Ice Shelf. Delineated in 1952 by John H. Roscoe from air photos taken by U.S. Navy Operation Highjump (1946–47). Named by Roscoe after Polarårboken, a polar journal published by the Norsk Polarklubb, Oslo, Norway.

See also
 List of glaciers in the Antarctic
 Glaciology

References
 

Glaciers of Ingrid Christensen Coast